"Glory Days" is a song written and performed by American rock singer Bruce Springsteen. In 1985, it became the fifth single released from his 1984 album Born in the U.S.A.

History
The song is a seriocomic tale of a man who now ruefully looks back on his so-called "glory days" and those of people he knew during high school.  The lyrics to the first verse are autobiographical, being a recount of an encounter Springsteen had with former Little League baseball teammate Joe DePugh in the summer of 1973.

The music is jocular, consisting of what Springsteen biographer Dave Marsh called "rinky-dink organ, honky-tonk piano, and garage-band guitar kicked along by an explosive tom-tom pattern".

The single peaked at #5 on the Billboard Hot 100 pop singles charts in the summer of 1985.  It was the fifth of a record-tying seven Top 10 hit singles to be released from Born in the U.S.A.

Missing verse
An alternate mix of the song includes an extra verse about the narrator's father, who worked at the Ford auto plant in Metuchen, New Jersey, for twenty years and who now spends most of his time at the American Legion Hall, thinking about how he "ain't never had glory days." However, after Springsteen realized that this verse did not fit with the song's storyline, it was cut out.

Reception
Cash Box described the single as "rowdy, raucous and set for good AOR and CHR airplay...with something for everybody and for all markets."

Music video
The music video for the song was shot in late May 1985 in various locations in New Jersey, and was directed by filmmaker John Sayles, the third video he had done for the album. It featured a narrative story of Springsteen, playing the protagonist in the song, talking to his young son and pitching to a wooden backstop against an imaginary lineup (he eventually lost the game to Graig Nettles). The baseball field scene was shot at Miller Park Stadium in West New York, New Jersey. The field is inside a city block surrounded mostly by homes. Intercut with these were scenes of Springsteen and the E Street Band lip-synching the song in a bar.  The bar performance scenes were filmed at Maxwell's in Hoboken, New Jersey.

Although he had left the band the prior year, Steven Van Zandt was invited back to perform in this video, but the two new members of the band, Nils Lofgren and Patti Scialfa, who had not been on the record at all, were also featured.  Springsteen's then-wife Julianne Phillips made a cameo appearance at the baseball field at the end.

The video began airing on MTV in mid-June 1985 and went into heavy rotation. The music video received two MTV Video Music Awards nominations, Best Male Video and Best Overall Performance at the 1986 MTV Video Music Awards.

Clips of New York Mets pitcher Dwight Gooden striking out a couple of batters in real games appear in the video.

Personnel
According to authors Philippe Margotin and Jean-Michel Guesdon:

Bruce Springsteen – vocals, guitars
E Street Band
Steven Van Zandt – guitars, mandolin, vocal harmonies, vocals
Roy Bittan – keyboard
Clarence Clemons – tambourine
Danny Federici – organ
Garry Tallent – bass
Max Weinberg – drums

Track listing
 "Glory Days" – 4:15
 "Stand On It" – 2:30

The B-side of the single, "Stand On It", was a rocker occasionally brought out for encores at concerts. It was a late 1980s hit for country singer Mel McDaniel, and was also featured in the 1986 film Ruthless People and its accompanying soundtrack album.

Charts

Weekly charts

Year-end charts

Certifications

References

 Born in the U.S.A. The World Tour (tour booklet, 1985), Tour chronology.
 Marsh, Dave.  Glory Days: Bruce Springsteen in the 1980s.  Pantheon Books, 1987.  .
 Brucebase recording sessions history
 Killing Floor song performance database
 Palm Beach Post News: Their 'Glory Days' of Friendship

Bruce Springsteen songs
1984 songs
1985 singles
Songs written by Bruce Springsteen
Song recordings produced by Jon Landau
Columbia Records singles
Music videos directed by John Sayles
Song recordings produced by Bruce Springsteen
Song recordings produced by Steven Van Zandt
Song recordings produced by Chuck Plotkin
Songs about nostalgia